Arethusa Flora Gartside Leigh-White (née Hawker) (3 January 1885 – 1959) was the second World Association Director, whose nine years in office ended in 1947. She had the difficult years of World War II to contend with, and spent some time in the Western Hemisphere building Girl Guiding there. The immediate postwar reconstruction in Europe came under her guidance, and she and J. S. Wilson had to address and adjust policy accordingly.

See also

World Scout Committee

References

Scouting Round the World, John S. Wilson, first edition, Blandford Press 1959 page 203.

External links
 Bantry House, Co. Cork

Girl Guiding and Girl Scouting
1885 births
1959 deaths